Stephen John Pickell (born August 11, 1957) is a Canadian retired competition swimmer.

Swimming career
Pickell won a silver medal in the men's 4x100-metre medley relay at the 1976 Summer Olympics in Montreal, Quebec, Canada.  He did so alongside Graham Smith, Clay Evans and Gary MacDonald. Despite being Canadian he won the 1969 ASA National British Championships 100 metres backstroke title and the 200 metres backstroke title.

See also
 List of Commonwealth Games medallists in swimming (men)
 List of Olympic medalists in swimming (men)

References

Canadian Olympic Committee
sports-reference

1957 births
Living people
Canadian male backstroke swimmers
Olympic silver medalists for Canada
Olympic swimmers of Canada
Swimmers from Vancouver
Swimmers at the 1974 British Commonwealth Games
Swimmers at the 1976 Summer Olympics
Swimmers at the 1979 Pan American Games
USC Trojans men's swimmers
Medalists at the 1976 Summer Olympics
Pan American Games silver medalists for Canada
Pan American Games bronze medalists for Canada
Olympic silver medalists in swimming
Commonwealth Games medallists in swimming
Commonwealth Games gold medallists for Canada
Commonwealth Games silver medallists for Canada
Pan American Games medalists in swimming
Medalists at the 1979 Pan American Games
Medallists at the 1974 British Commonwealth Games